Samuel Whitaker Pennypacker (April 9, 1843 – September 2, 1916) was an American politician and the 23rd governor of Pennsylvania, serving from 1903 to 1907.  

A judge assigned to Pennsylvania's Court of Common Pleas system prior to his election as governor, he also researched and wrote about Pennsylvania history.

Biography
Gov. Pennypacker was born in Phoenixville, Pennsylvania on April 9, 1843. He was the son of Dr. Isaac A. Pennypacker and Anna Maria Whitaker, and the grandson of Matthias and Sarah Anderson (daughter of Isaac Anderson), and of Joseph and Grace Whitaker. He was a cousin of Galusha Pennypacker. He received his education at the Grovemont Seminary at Phoenixville and at the West Philadelphia Institute.
He was the fourth great-grandson of Abraham op den Graeff. His great great great grandfather Hendrick Pannebecker emigrated to Pennsylvania in 1699.

Pennypacker's early education was interrupted several times. In 1863, he answered a call to arms by Governor Andrew Curtin during the Gettysburg Campaign of the American Civil War. He enlisted as a private in Company F of the 26th Pennsylvania Volunteer Militia and trained at Camp Curtin. He fought in the skirmish at Witmer Farm, north of Gettysburg on June 26, 1863, an action that saw his newly recruited regiment retreat to Harrisburg when confronted by veteran Virginia cavalry. He left the emergency militia in late July 1863 and resumed his education.

Pennypacker studied law at the University of Pennsylvania and opened his own law practice in 1866. Elected president of the Law Academy of Philadelphia in 1868, he was then also selected for membership with the American Philosophical Society in 1886.

From 1876 to 1888, he was reporter-in-chief for the Court of Common Pleas No. 3. In 1889, he was appointed judge of the Court of Common Pleas No. 2 and was elected for two terms of ten years each, acting for several years (1896-1902) as president judge of that court. In 1902, he soundly defeated Robert Pattison, who was seeking a third nonconsecutive term as governor. During his term in office, Pennypacker signed into law the Child Labor Act of 1905; setting a minimum age and standard for young workers. He created the Pennsylvania State Police and the State Museum, and oversaw the completion of the new state capitol building. He led a war on the easy divorce system of Pennsylvania.

He also signed the Salus-Grady libel law, requiring newspapers to print the names of their owners and editors and making them responsible for negligence. The Salus-Grady law also banned "any cartoon or caricature or picture portraying, describing or representing any person, either by distortion, innuendo or otherwise, in the form or likeness of beast, bird, fish, insect, or other unhuman animal, thereby tending to expose such person to public hatred, contempt, or ridicule."  Pennypacker had been insultingly caricatured as a parrot during his campaign, mindlessly mimicking the words of his political bosses. The passage of this law was widely criticized, not least by Pennsylvania cartoonists who immediately began depicting political figures as inanimate objects and vegetables. The furor was observed nationwide, and the law was never enforced.

In 1906, Pennypacker vetoed what would have been the first compulsory sterilization law in the United States. At the time of the veto, Pennypacker stated:

It is plain that the safest and most effective method of preventing procreation would be to cut the heads off the inmates, and such authority is given by the bill to this staff of scientific experts...Scientists like all men whose experiences have been limited to one pursuit...sometimes need to be restrained. Men of high scientific attainments are prone...to lose sight of broad principles outside of their domain...To permit such an operation would be to inflict cruelty upon a helpless class...which the state has undertaken to protect..."

During his time in office, Pennypacker made his home in Schwenksville at Pennypacker Mills, a  farm and mansion that eight generations of Pennypackers lived in before it was eventually donated to Montgomery County and is now a historic park. He also used Moore Hall as a summer home.

Pennypacker was later president of the Historical Society of Pennsylvania, a trustee of the University of Pennsylvania and held positions of honor in various German and Netherlandish societies. As president of the Historical Society of Pennsylvania, he wrote extensively. Amongst his publications was a history of the Phoenixville area, Annals of Phoenixville and Its Vicinity: From the Settlement to the Year 1871. He had a collection of over 10,000 items pertaining to Pennsylvania history. In 1915, he was appointed chairman of the Public Service Commission of Pennsylvania, which office he held until his death.

He married Virginia Earl Broomall in 1870. They had four children. He died at Pennypacker Mills, aged 73, and was buried in Morris Cemetery, Phoenixville. Pennypacker Hall at the Penn State University Park campus is named for him, as is the Samuel W. Pennypacker School at Philadelphia.

Works

Historical and biographical sketches (1883)
The settlement of Germantown, Pennsylvania, and the beginning of German emigration to North America (1899)
Pennsylvania in American History (1910)
Desecration and Profanation of the Pennsylvania State Capitol (1911)
The Autobiography of a Pennsylvanian (1918)

Notes

References

Collection of Samuel Pennypacker biographies
Pennsylvania State Archives biography of Samuel Pennypacker
Brief biography
Pennypacker Mills

1843 births
1916 deaths
Republican Party governors of Pennsylvania
Judges of the Pennsylvania Courts of Common Pleas
Pennsylvania lawyers
Union Army soldiers
University of Pennsylvania Law School alumni
People from Montgomery County, Pennsylvania
People of Pennsylvania in the American Civil War
19th-century American historians
19th-century American male writers
American Lutherans
American people of German descent
Historians from Pennsylvania
19th-century American judges
19th-century American lawyers
19th-century Lutherans
Whitaker iron family
Members of the American Philosophical Society
19th-century American businesspeople
American male non-fiction writers